Lexington class could refer to two classes of ships of the U.S. Navy:

  - a class of six battlecruisers designed during World War I, they were being constructed when the Washington Naval Treaty forced the cancellation of the class. The two that were the most advanced in their construction became aircraft carriers, (see below) while the other four were scrapped.
  - the conversion of two of the battlecruisers to aircraft carriers.